The 1911 St. Bonaventure Brown and White football team represented St. Bonaventure University during the 1911 college football season. Under first-year head coach and captain Daniel Pickett, the St. Bonaventure eleven compiled a 2–2 record, and were outscored by their opponents 80 to 11.
Nicknames for the football team included the Brown and White, as that was their school colors, and the Alleganians, given St. Bonaventure's proximity to Allegany, New York. 

St. Bonaventure also fielded a reserve team, captained by Donovan, and defeated Renovo 20 to 5 on November 11. Of the 11 points amassed by the football team, ten were scored by halfback Clare, while fullback Regan completed one extra point in the contest against Bradford.

Schedule

Reserves schedule

Roster

References

St. Bonaventure
St. Bonaventure Brown Indians football seasons
St. Bonaventure Brown and White football